Milbanke Sound is a sound on the coast of the Canadian province of British Columbia.

Geography
Milbanke Sound extends east from Queen Charlotte Sound, with Price Island on the west, Swindle Island on the north, and the Bardswell Group of islands on the south. Milbanke Sound is one of the open sea portions of the Inside Passage, with Seaforth Channel joining from the east and Finlayson Channel from the north. Mathieson Channel also connects to Milbanke Sound from the north, and leads to Fiordland Conservancy.

On the islands surrounding the sound is a group of five volcanos called the Milbanke Sound cones.

History
The Heiltsuk peoples traditionally occupied the land around Milbanke Sound.

He spent a few days trading with the Heiltsuk. He named the sound after Vice Admiral Mark Milbanke. Explorer George Vancouver sailed through the sound a few years later. In 1805, a trading ship from Boston, the Atahualpa, was attacked by a group of Tlingit; the captain and some of the crew were killed.

In 1833 the Hudson's Bay Company established Fort McLoughlin in the Milbanke Sound area. William Fraser Tolmie was stationed there in 1833-1834. Tolmie wrote about the fur trade in the area, saying that it was conducted with the Coast Tsimshians and Heiltsuks, using a pidgin jargon composed of the Kaigani and Tshatshinni dialects of Haida and English. Chinook Jargon, commonly used elsewhere, was not widely known in Milbanke Sound at the time. The fort operated for about ten years, and then was abandoned; the company later opened a small store at the same location.

To improve the safety of the developing travel and shipping lanes, a lighthouse was built in 1898 at Robb Point on Ivory Island.

In recent times archaeological investigations have been carried out in the Milbanke Sound area.

Economy
The sound is popular with sports fishing enthusiasts.

See also
 Milbanke Sound Group

References

External links

 

Sounds of British Columbia
Central Coast of British Columbia
Heiltsuk
Range 3 Coast Land District